Peter Kocák (born 5 January 1982) is a Slovak former professional ice hockey right winger.

Kocák played a total of 357 games for HK 36 Skalica of the Slovak Extraliga over nine seasons. He also played twelve games for HC Plzeň of the Czech Extraliga during the 2005–06 season.

References

External links

1982 births
Living people
SHK Hodonín players
BK Mladá Boleslav players
Sportspeople from Skalica
HC Plzeň players
HK 91 Senica players
HK 36 Skalica players
SK Horácká Slavia Třebíč players
Slovak ice hockey right wingers
Slovak expatriate ice hockey players in the Czech Republic